Gratitude is an emotion.

Gratitude or Gratitud may also refer to:

Music
Gratitude (band), an early 2000s American rock band

Albums
Gratitud, by Fonseca, or the title song, 2008
Gratitude (Benjamin Francis Leftwich album) or the title song, 2019
Gratitude (Chris Potter album) or the title song, 2001
Gratitude (Dayna Stephens album), 2017
Gratitude (Earth, Wind & Fire album) or the title song, 1975
Gratitude (Gratitude album), 2005 
Gratitude (Lisa album), 2004
Gratitude (P-Money album) or the title song, 2013

Songs
"Gratitude" (Beastie Boys song), 1992
"Gratitude", by Björk from Drawing Restraint 9, 2005
"Gratitude" (Brandon Lake song), 2020
"Gratitude", by Big Red Machine from their self-titled album, 2018
"GrAttitude", by Bruno Sutter from Bruno Sutter, 2015
"Gratitude", by Danny Elfman and Oingo Boingo from So-Lo, 1984
"Gratitude", by Paul McCartney from Memory Almost Full, 2007

Other uses
Gratitude Fund, an American non-profit organization
Gratitude Magwanishe, South African politician
Gratitude, a 2015 book by Oliver Sacks

See also
Grateful (disambiguation)